Giulio Gaudini (28 September 1904 – 6 January 1948) was an Italian foil and sabre fencer. He competed at the 1924, 1928, 1932 and 1936 Olympics and won three gold, four silver, and two bronze medals. He was the flag bearer for Italy at the 1936 Games. At the world championships, he earned 17 medals between 1929 and 1938. He died of cancer, aged 43.

See also
 Legends of Italian sport - Walk of Fame
List of multiple Olympic medalists
Italy national fencing team – Multiple medallist
List of multiple Summer Olympic medalists

References

External links
 

1904 births
1948 deaths
Italian male fencers
Olympic fencers of Italy
Fencers at the 1924 Summer Olympics
Fencers at the 1928 Summer Olympics
Fencers at the 1932 Summer Olympics
Fencers at the 1936 Summer Olympics
Olympic gold medalists for Italy
Olympic silver medalists for Italy
Olympic bronze medalists for Italy
Fencers from Rome
Olympic medalists in fencing
Medalists at the 1928 Summer Olympics
Medalists at the 1932 Summer Olympics
Medalists at the 1936 Summer Olympics